Mikita Shuhunkow (born 17 April 1992) is a Belarusian professional football player.

Honours
Naftan Novopolotsk
Belarusian Cup winner: 2011–12

External links

1992 births
Living people
People from Mogilev
Sportspeople from Mogilev Region
Belarusian footballers
Association football forwards
FC Naftan Novopolotsk players
FC Vitebsk players
FC Belshina Bobruisk players
FC Smorgon players
FC Orsha players
FC Shakhtyor Petrikov players